The Archaeopsyllini form a flea tribe (or depending on the classification a subfamily called Archaeopsyllinae) in the family Pulicidae.

References

External links

Pulicidae
Insect tribes